On was the second album from English rock band Echobelly. Gaining a favourable response from critics, the album reached number 4 in the UK Albums Chart becoming their most commercially successful album. The album spawned three top 40 singles two of which managed to reach the top 20. On 21 July 2014, a 2CD expanded edition of the album was released with B-sides and previously unreleased live performances.

Album title

The album title was inspired by a poster found by Glen and Sonya. The poster had the word "no" across it in blood red. By turning the word around, it became a positive, and thus decided to title the album On.

Track listing
All songs written by Sonya Madan and Glenn Johansson.

Original 1995 release
 "Car Fiction" - 2:31
 "King of the Kerb" - 3:59
 "Great Things" - 3:31
 "Natural Animal" - 3:27
 "Go Away" - 2:44
 "Pantyhose and Roses" - 3:25
 "Something Hot in a Cold Country" - 4:01
 "Four Letter Word" - 2:51
 "Nobody Like You" - 3:52
 "In the Year" - 3:31
 "Dark Therapy" - 5:30
 "Worms and Angels" - 2:38

Bonus tracks included with the 2014 reissue
"Here Comes the Scene" – 3:16
 "God's Guest List" – 3:35
 "On Turn Off" – 3:17
 "On Turn On" – 3:18
 "Bunty" – 2:12
 "One After 5am" – 2:14 
 "Car Fiction" (French version) – 2:32
 "On Turn On" (acoustic) – 3:18
 "Natural Animal" (acoustic) – 3:45
 "We Know Better" – 4:02
 "Atom" – 2:49
 "Aloha Lolita" – 3:42

Tracks 13-18 are b-sides from "Great Things".
Tracks 19-21 are b-sides from "King Of The Kerb".
Tracks 22-24 are b-sides from "Dark Therapy".

Disc 2 included with the 2014 reissue

Tracks 1-13 Live at Wetalands NYC - 9 September 1995, and Tracks 14-17 from the John Peel BBC Radio One Session - 1 April 1995 
 "I Can't Imagine the World Without Me" – 3:59
 "Car Fiction" – 2:45
 "Close... But" – 3:12
 "Dark Therapy" – 6:38
 "Father Ruler King Computer" – 3:31
 "Give Her a Gun" – 3:56
 "Go Away" – 2:55
 "Great Things" – 3:46
 "Insomniac" – 3:59
 "King of the Kerb" – 5:02
 "Natural Animal" – 3:35
 "Pantyhose and Roses" – 3:44
 "Today, Tomorrow, Sometime, Never" – 3:29
 "Four Letter Word" – 3:39
 "Car Fiction" – 2:23
 "Pantyhose and Roses" – 3:37
 "Go Away" – 2:47

Singles

"Great Things" was released as the first single, and reached 13 in the UK Singles Chart.
"King Of The Kerb" was released as the second single, and reached 25 in the UK Singles Chart.
"Dark Therapy" was released as the third single, and reached 20 in the UK Singles Chart.

Personnel

Echobelly
 Sonya Madan - vocals
 Glenn Johansson - guitar
 Debbie Smith - guitar
 Alex Keyser - bass
 Andy Henderson - drums

Original album and B-sides
Sean Slade & Paul Kolderie - Engineers on tracks 1-21, Producers on tracks 1-18
Echobelly - Producer on track 19-21
Glen Johansson and Simon Vinestock - Producer on tracks 22-24
Jim Brumby - Engineer on tracks 22-24
Simon Vinestock - Mixer on track 11

References

External links

On at YouTube (streamed copy where licensed)

1995 albums
Echobelly albums
Albums produced by Paul Q. Kolderie
Albums produced by Sean Slade